An All-American team is an honorary sports team composed of the best amateur players of a specific season for each team position—who in turn are given the honorific "All-America" and typically referred to as "All-American athletes", or simply "All-Americans".  Although the honorees generally do not compete together as a unit, the term is used in U.S. team sports to refer to players who are selected by members of the national media.  Walter Camp selected the first All-America team in the early days of American football in 1889.  The 2010 NCAA Men's Basketball All-Americans are honorary lists that include All-American selections from the Associated Press (AP), the United States Basketball Writers Association (USBWA), the Sporting News (TSN), and the National Association of Basketball Coaches (NABC) for the 2009–10 NCAA Division I men's basketball season.  All selectors choose at least a first and second 5-man team. The NABC and AP choose third teams, and TSN chooses third, fourth and fifth teams, while AP also lists honorable mention selections.

The Consensus 2010 College Basketball All-American team is determined by aggregating the results of the four major All-American teams as determined by the National Collegiate Athletic Association (NCAA).  Since United Press International was replaced by TSN in 1997, the four major selectors have been the aforementioned ones.  AP has been a selector since 1948, NABC since 1957 and USBWA since 1960.  To earn "consensus" status, a player must win honors based on a point system computed from the four different all-America teams. The point system consists of three points for first team, two points for second team and one point for third team. No honorable mention or fourth team or lower are used in the computation.  The top five totals plus ties are first team and the next five plus ties are second team.  According to this system, Sherron Collins, Wesley Johnson, Scottie Reynolds, Evan Turner and John Wall were first team selections and Cole Aldrich, James Anderson, DeMarcus Cousins, Luke Harangody, Jon Scheyer and Greivis Vasquez were second team selections.

Although the aforementioned lists are used to determine consensus honors, there are numerous other All-American lists.  The ten finalists for the John Wooden Award are described as Wooden All-Americans.  The ten finalists for the Lowe's Senior CLASS Award are described as Senior All-Americans.  Other All-American lists include those determined by Fox Sports, and Yahoo! Sports.  The scholar-athletes selected by College Sports Information Directors of America (CoSIDA) are termed Academic All-Americans.

2010 Consensus All-America team
The following players are recognized as the 2010 Consensus All-Americans (including six second team members due to a tie).

PG – Point guard
SG – Shooting guard
PF – Power forward
SF – Small forward
C – Center

Individual All-America teams
The table below details the selections for four major 2010 college basketball All-American teams.  The number corresponding to the team designation (i.e., whether a player was a first team, second team, etc. selection) appears in the table.  The following columns are included in the table:

Player – The name of the All-American
School – Collegiate affiliation
AP – Associated Press All-American Team
USBWA – United States Basketball Writers Association All-American Team
NABC – National Association of Basketball Coaches All-American Team
TSN – Sporting News All-American Team
CP - Points in the consensus scoring system
Notes – Collegiate highlights

By player

By team

AP Honorable Mention:

Al-Farouq Aminu, Wake Forest
Kevin Anderson, Richmond
Luke Babbitt, Nevada
Keith Benson, Oakland
Matt Bouldin, Gonzaga
Randy Culpepper, UTEP
Noah Dahlman, Wofford
Malcolm Delaney, Virginia Tech
Devan Downey, South Carolina
Muhammad El-Amin, Stony Brook
Kenneth Faried, Morehead State
Alex Franklin, Siena
Jimmer Fredette, Brigham Young
Marquez Haynes, Texas-Arlington
Gordon Hayward, Butler
Lazar Hayward, Marquette
Adnan Hodžić, Lipscomb
Reggie Holmes, Morgan State
Robbie Hummel, Purdue
Charles Jenkins, Hofstra
Garrison Johnson, Jackson State
Orlando Johnson, UC Santa Barbara
Tyren Johnson, Louisiana-Lafayette
Dominique Jones, South Florida
Adam Koch, Northern Iowa
David Kool, Western Michigan
Damian Lillard, Weber State
Kalin Lucas, Michigan State
CJ McCollum, Lehigh
E’Twaun Moore, Purdue
Artsiom Parakhouski, Radford
Patrick Patterson, Kentucky
Quincy Pondexter, Washington
Jacob Pullen, Kansas State
Jerome Randle, California
Andy Rautins, Syracuse
Justin Rutty, Quinnipiac
Omar Samhan, Saint Mary’s
Kyle Singler, Duke
Ekpe Udoh, Baylor
Jarvis Varnado, Mississippi State
Hassan Whiteside, Marshall
Ryan Wittman, Cornell

Academic All-Americans

On February 22, 2010, CoSIDA and ESPN The Magazine announced the 2010 Academic All-America team, with Cole Aldrich headlining the University Division as the men's college basketball Academic All-American of the Year.  The following is the 2009–10 ESPN The Magazine Academic All-America Men’s Basketball Team (University Division) as selected by CoSIDA:

Wooden All-Americans
The ten finalists (and ties) for the John R. Wooden Award are called Wooden All-Americans.  The 10 honorees are as follows:

Senior All-Americans
The ten finalists for the Lowe's Senior CLASS Award are called Senior All-Americans.  The 10 honorees are as follows:

References

External links
All-American teams from Fox Sports and Yahoo! Sports

All-Americans
NCAA Men's Basketball All-Americans